The 2015 Ottawa Redblacks season was the second season for the team in the Canadian Football League. The Redblacks improved upon their unimpressive 2–16 record from 2014 after just five games when they collected their third win in week five against the Calgary Stampeders. Ottawa clinched a playoff berth in week 17 with a victory over the Winnipeg Blue Bombers on October 16, 2015. The Redblacks became the first Ottawa-based CFL team to have a winning record since 1979. They were also the first Ottawa-based CFL team to finish first in East Division since the 1978 Rough Riders and the first Ottawa-based team ever to finish with at least 12 regular season wins.

The Redblacks posted the fifth best winning percentage posted by a second year expansion team in any established North American professional sports league after the 1951 Cleveland Browns, the 1995 Baltimore Stallions, the 1996 Carolina Panthers and the 1997 Montreal Alouettes – although of those four teams, only the Stallions and Panthers were expansion teams in the same sense as the Redblacks and only the Panthers had a losing record in their inaugural season.

On November 22, 2015, the Redblacks defeated the Hamilton Tiger-Cats 35–28 in the Eastern Final to advance to their first Grey Cup game, which they lost 26–20 to the Edmonton Eskimos. It was the first time that an Ottawa CFL team advanced to the Grey Cup game since the 1981 Ottawa Rough Riders.

Off-season

Trades 
On January 15, 2015, the Redblacks traded Jasper Simmons and Dan Buckner to the Calgary Stampeders in exchange for Maurice Price. Ottawa is hoping that Price can provide the offense with some explosiveness which the team lacked during its inaugural season.

Free agency 
Within the first two days of the start of the free agency period, the Redblacks made four substantial acquisitions. On February 10, 2015, the Redblacks signed Ernest Jackson from the BC Lions to a two-year, $270,000 deal. The next day Ottawa announced they had signed Greg Ellingson (from the Tiger-Cats), SirVincent Rogers (from the Argonauts), and former Ottawa Gee-Gees quarterback and current wide receiver Brad Sinopoli (from the Stampeders). On April 21, 2015, the Redblacks announced they had signed wide receiver Chris Williams. Williams had a very productive two seasons with the Ti-Cats accumulating 153 receptions for 2,362 receiving yards 17 receiving touchdowns, 1,198 punt return yards and five punt returns for touchdowns.

CFL draft 
The 2015 CFL Draft took place on May 12, 2015. The Redblacks had six selections in the seven-round draft, including the first overall pick where they selected Ottawa native Alex Mateas. The club traded their third-round pick to Calgary for Justin Phillips.

Training camp 
The Redblacks conducted their spring mini-camp at TD Place Stadium on April 27–29. Rookies reported to training camp on May 27, with veterans following a few days later on May 31. Training camp was held at Keith Harris Stadium on the campus of Carleton University.

Preseason 
Due to the 2015 FIFA Women's World Cup taking place in June at TD Place Stadium, the Redblacks played their home pre-season game at Telus Stadium in Quebec City, Quebec on the campus of the Université Laval. It was the second game that an Ottawa CFL franchise played in Quebec City, with the first being in 2003, and the second consecutive year that the Redblacks played their home pre-season game away from Ottawa.

 Games played with colour uniforms.

Regular season

Standings

Schedule

 Games played with colour uniforms.
 Games played with white uniforms.
 Games played with alternate uniforms.

Post-season

Schedule

 Games played with colour uniforms.
 Games played with white uniforms.

Team

Roster

Coaching staff

References

Ottawa Redblacks
Ottawa Redblacks seasons
Ottawa Redblacks